Jaromír Zmrhal (born 2 August 1993) is a Czech professional footballer who plays as a midfielder for Slovan Bratislava and the Czech Republic national team. He can play as a central midfielder or left winger.

Club career

Slavia Prague
Jaromír Zmrhal broke into the Slavia Prague first team in 2012, making his league debut on 4 August in a 2–2 Gambrinus liga away draw against Baník Ostrava. He scored his first league goal three weeks later in a 5–0 home win against FC Zbrojovka Brno. He then went on to appear in 83 out of 90 league matches over the next three seasons, scoring five goals. In the 2015–16 season, he scored the winning goal in the Slavia - Sparta derby on 27 September 2015 with a powerful long-range effort.

On 9 May 2018, he played as Slavia Prague won the 2017–18 Czech Cup final against Jablonec.

Brescia 
On 6 August 2019, Zmrhal signed a 4 year contract with Italian club Brescia. The transfer fee was reported to be €3.75m.

Loan to Mladá Boleslav 
On 1 February 2021, Zmrhal moved to Czech club Mladá Boleslav, on a loan deal until the end of the season.

International career
Zmrhal got his first call up to the senior Czech Republic side for 2018 FIFA World Cup qualifiers against Germany and Azerbaijan in October 2016. He made his senior debut on 11 October 2016 against Azerbaijan. He scored his first goal in his second cap, a 2–1 home win against Norway in the World Cup qualification round.

Career statistics

Club

International goals
As of match played 11 November 2016. Czech Republic score listed first, score column indicates score after each Zmrhal goal.

Honours
Slavia Prague
 Czech Cup: 2017–18

Slovan Bratislava
 Fortuna Liga: 2021–22

References

External links
 Jaromír Zmrhal official international statistics
 

1993 births
Living people
People from Žatec
Association football midfielders
Czech footballers
Czech expatriate footballers
Czech Republic youth international footballers
Czech Republic under-21 international footballers
Czech Republic international footballers
SK Slavia Prague players
Brescia Calcio players
FK Mladá Boleslav players
Czech First League players
Serie A players
Slovak Super Liga players
Expatriate footballers in Italy
Czech expatriate sportspeople in Italy
Expatriate footballers in Slovakia
Czech expatriate sportspeople in Slovakia
ŠK Slovan Bratislava players
Sportspeople from the Ústí nad Labem Region